Carl Heinrich Zöllner (born modern Oleśnica, Poland; 1792 – 1836) was a German composer. He is mainly remembered for one surviving work, the opera Kunz von Kaufungen, which premiered at the Theater an der Wien in March 1826. An organ work, Variations pour l'Orgue sur le Theme God Save the King also survives, as well as two shorter organ works, Ziemlich Langsam and Andante.

References

External links
Biography of Zöllner www.sibeliusmusic.com
Album of Choral Preludes from Classical to Modern Times In All Keys, Vol. 1
The Beginning Organist, Vol. 1

1792 births
1836 deaths
German composers
People from Oleśnica
People from the Province of Silesia
19th-century German musicians